Ǧwayáy or Ghwayai is the second month of the Afghan calendar. It has 31 days and falls within the spring season (from April 20/21 to May 20/21).

Ǧwayáy corresponds with the tropical Zodiac sign Taurus. Ǧwayáy literally means "bull" in Pashto.

Events 

 18 - 1324 - End of World War II in Europe
 10 – 1354 – Fall of Saigon
 7 - 1357 - The Saur Revolution led by the pro-Soviet People's Democratic Party of Afghanistan ousts President of Afghanistan Mohammed Daoud Khan, leading to his death and that of his family.
 6 – 1365 – Chernobyl disaster
 25 - 1367 - Soviet withdrawal from Afghanistan begins

Holidays 
 8 - Mujahideen Victory Day
 11 - International Workers' Day
 18 or 19 -Victory in Europe Day
 19 or 20 - Victory Day (9 May)
 Last Saturday of Ǧwayay - United States Armed Forces Day

Pashto names for the months of the Solar Hijri calendar

ps:غويی(مياشت)